Jiří Langmajer (born 3 June 1966) is a Czech theatre, television, and film actor.

Biography
Jiří Langmajer was born in Plzeň, Czechoslovakia. He studied music and drama at the Prague Conservatory from 1981 to 1987. While still a student, he was cast by director Karel Smyczek in the 1987 film Why? A year later, he appeared in the miniseries Třetí patro by the same director. After graduating, he played in various theatre ensembles and in 1992, he joined Divadlo pod Palmovkou, where he remained until 2005 (with the exception of 1998–2000, when he was engaged by Vinohrady Theatre).

In 1999, Langmajer received a Thalia Award for artists under 33. In 2003, he was nominated for an Alfréd Radok Award in the Actor of the Year category. He was nominated for a Czech Lion in 1999 for his supporting role in the film The Idiot Returns and in 2006 for Pravidla lži.

He has dubbed over eighty roles and performed in hundreds of radio plays.

In July 2019, Langmajer married actress Adéla Gondíková. He has two daughters from a previous marriage.

Selected filmography

Film

Television

References

External links

 

1966 births
Living people
Czech male film actors
Czech male stage actors
Czech male television actors
Czech male voice actors
20th-century Czech male actors
21st-century Czech male actors
Actors from Plzeň
Prague Conservatory alumni
Recipients of the Thalia Award